Harold Warnock Cottee  was an Australian businessman and philanthropist who was instrumental in making the food and drink company Cottee's Ltd one of the most successful companies in Australia at the time, which was eventually sold in 1966 for the highest price ever paid for an Australian company.

Early life
Harold Warnock Cottee was born in Lismore, NSW in 1898. He was one of 11 children born to Spencer Milton Cottee and Eliza Ellen Cottee (née Dorrough), who were staunch Methodists.

Business career
It was Cottee's father, Spencer Milton Cottee, who developed the drink Passiona on which the business was based. In 1924, Harold Cottee gave up the study of law to marry an English nurse, Lois Spencer, who persuaded him to move to Sydney and try to make a success of the company registered by him and his father in 1927 (The Bulletin 30 July 1968). With three children, the couple worked day and night to make a success of the company and, when funds became low, they returned to Lismore to finance their return to Sydney. In February 1928, with no further capital from shareholder sales, sales people were sacked and the company minutes noted that "the wisest course for the directors and secretaries is to resign and for the company to stand in abeyance". (Cottee's A Family Favourite, Celebrating 75 Years, page 25). 

While Spencer jumped from one venture to the next, his forward-thinking son Harold (HW) was curious like his father, but his curiosity was piqued more by people, particularly how their individual talents could be harnessed to ensure the success of his projects. He recognised that financial growth required perseverance and, ultimately it was HW who would transform the family's wonder drink into a wonder business. (Cottee's A Family Favourite, Celebrating 75 Years, page 20).

Their task was made more difficult when in 1929 the Great Depression following the 1929 Wall Street Stock Market Crash led to many businesses closing down.

The company eventually started to make a profit and, recognising that financial growth depended on perseverance, Cottee transformed a family business into a wonder business. (Cottee's A Family Favourite, Celebrating 75 Years, page 20). The logo "Cottee's" on the labels of the products was reminiscent of his personal signature.

Following the advent of World War II, Cottee's Passiona Pty Ltd was selected to produce food for the armed forces, and the expansion of the company continued until in the 1950s, by which time Cottee's was as famous for its jams, jellies, spreads and syrups as it was for Passiona and other soft drinks. Cottee always believed that people were willing to pay a little more for a quality product.

By 1958, the company had trebled its resources as well as maintaining a 15% dividend rate (Australian Financial Review 10 July 1958) and under the direction of Cottee, the business developed into one of Australia's major food and soft drink companies, with interests in all states.(The Australian Financial Review 5 April 1968)

Cottee was proud of his all-Australian company and resisted overtures from interested overseas buyers, but eventually, when the U.S company General Foods made an extremely high offer, he felt the shareholders should make the decision. In 1966, Cottee's was bought by General Foods for the sum of $6 million, the highest price paid for an Australian company up to that time. Cottee was installed as chairman of Cottee's General Foods Ltd and retired two years later. (Australian Financial Review 5 April 1968.)

Philanthropy
Throughout his life Cottee gave generously to the Methodist church and other organisations he felt were worthy. He particularly wanted to help disadvantaged children and young people. In 1961, he introduced passion fruit growing to Fiji and, after the sale of Cottee's Ltd., he bought the business himself to ensure the people of Sigatoka could continue to produce a cash crop and develop their community. The Fijians rewarded him by presenting him with a tabua (sperm whale's tooth),  the highest honour bestowed in Fiji.

Also in 1961, Cottee started to establish an orchard in Renmark, South Australia on 500 acres of virgin land, a property 2.5 kilometres long and half a kilometre wide. Cottee piped water several kilometres from the Murray River, and the property eventually became the largest citrus farm in the southern hemisphere, developed specifically as a donation to Wesley Mission. An example of his optimism and foresight, Cottee knew that this venture would not generate a profit for seven years but did not live to see that happen. The Mission cited the donation of the orchard as its greatest bequest ever up to that time and which showed how a thoughtful bequest can lead to ongoing support. By 2007, needy children in Sydney had benefited by more than $2 million dollars from the sale of oranges and orange juice.

Cottee supported the Wesley Mission for years and helped finance Alan Walker's "Mission to the Nation", In 1980, Dalmars Children's Homes opened a teenage refuge in Ashfield, Sydney, called "The Harold W. And Lois Cottee Lodge" in recognition of the late Harold Cottee and his wife.

Honours
On 12 June 1971, Harold Warnock Cottee, company director, received an Order of the British Empire (OBE) for services to industry and the community, and was about to be knighted when he died in 1973.

Death
Cottee was survived by his wife Lois and his seven children: Jean Lois, Harold Spencer, Kenneth James, Rosemary, Pauline, Carole and Dianne.

References

 Hodge, Rosemary. My Family History 

1898 births
1973 deaths
Australian business executives
Australian Officers of the Order of the British Empire